This is a list of public holidays in Greenland.

Public holidays

References 

Greenland
Greenlandic culture
Greenland